Mustafa Bin Dardef (1968 – 18 October 2011) was a popular field commander from the Zintan brigade of the Anti-Gaddafi forces during the Libyan Civil War. He was killed by a mortar round just two days before the fall of Sirte and death of former Libyan leader Muammar Gaddafi.

Life
Bin Dardef was a businessman in the Mediterranean city of Benghazi before he joined the uprising, importing medical equipment and children's toys, and was twice jailed under the Gaddafi regime for his alleged Islamist leanings. He commanded the Fakhri Alsalabi unit, named after a pilot killed in mid-March, and fought in the second battle of Benghazi. He left behind a son and four daughters.

He was active in the battle of Sirte, being the commander who announced the capture of Sirte's port on 26 September and speaking to news crews discussing the latest advances. He also announced the reports that Moussa Ibrahim had been captured in September, although this would later prove untrue. Ibrahim was again reported captured when Sirte fell, however, this was again proven to be untrue. On 22 October 2011, he was again reportedly captured for a third time, along with Saif al-Islam Gaddafi, near Bani Walid.

Death
Bin Dardef died when a mortar round slammed into a vehicle packed with ammunition. A piece of metal tore into his bullet-proof vest while another ripped his throat, killing him almost instantly. He was buried in Benghazi's Martyrs' Cemetery, along with other fighters who had died in Sirte.

References

1968 births
2011 deaths
Libyan military personnel killed in action
People killed in the First Libyan Civil War
Libyan businesspeople
People from Benghazi